Abraham the Jew may refer to:

 Abraham, ancestor of the Jews in the Book of Genesis
 Abraham of Worms, student of Abramelin in The Book of Abramelin

See also

Abraham (disambiguation)
Jew (disambiguation)